The 2009 Saint Louis Billikens men's soccer team represented Saint Louis University during the 2009 NCAA Division I men's soccer season.

Schedule

References 

Saint Louis Billikens
Saint Louis Billikens men's soccer seasons
Saint Louis Billikens, Soccer Men
Saint Louis Billikens